Acceleration Team Slovakia is the Slovak team of Formula Acceleration 1, an international racing series. They are run by Team Ghinzani, owned by Piercarlo Ghinzani.

History

2014 season 
Drivers: Richard Gonda

The team announced Richard Gonda as their driver for the inaugural Formula Acceleration 1 season.

Drivers

Complete Formula Acceleration 1 Results

References 

Slovakia
A
Sports teams in Slovakia